The 5th Illinois Cavalry Regiment was a cavalry regiment that served in the Union Army during the American Civil War.

Service
The  5th Illinois Volunteer Cavalry was mustered into service at Camp Butler, Illinois, on August 31, 1861.

The regiment was mustered out on October 27, 1865.

Total strength and casualties
The regiment suffered 28 enlisted men who were killed in action or who died of their wounds and 5 officers and 414 enlisted men who died of disease, for a total of 447
fatalities.

Commanders
 Colonel Hall Wilson: mustered 12 Dec. 1861, resigned 19 Jan. 1863 because of typhoid and diarrhea.
 Colonel John McConnell - mustered out October 27, 1865

See also
 List of Illinois Civil War Units
 Illinois in the American Civil War

Notes

References
 The Civil War Archive

Units and formations of the Union Army from Illinois
1861 establishments in Illinois
Military units and formations established in 1861
Military units and formations disestablished in 1865